
Drawsko County is a unit of territorial administration and local government (powiat) in West Pomeranian Voivodeship, north-western Poland. It came into being on January 1, 1999, as a result of the Polish local government reforms passed in 1998.

As of 2015 its total population is 58,062, out of which the population of Złocieniec is 13,377, that of Drawsko Pomorskie is 11,465, that of Czaplinek is 6,933, that of Kalisz Pomorski is 3,989, and the rural population is 22,309.

The eastern part of the county contains part of the protected area known as Drawsko Landscape Park.

Neighbouring counties
Drawsko County is bordered by Świdwin County to the north, Szczecinek County and Złotów County to the east, Wałcz County to the south-east, Choszczno County to the south, Stargard County to the west, and Łobez County to the north-west.

Administrative division
The county is subdivided into six gminas (four urban-rural and two rural). These are listed in the following table, in descending order of population.

See also
Polish official population figures 2006

 
Drawsko